Leptotrophon surprisensis is a species of sea snail, a marine gastropod mollusk in the family Muricidae, the murex snails or rock snails.

Description
The length of the shell attains 15 mm.

Distribution
This marine species occurs off New Caledonia at a depth of 530 m.

References

 Houart, R. (1995). The Trophoninae (Gastropoda: Muricidae) of the New Caledonia region. in: Bouchet, P. (Ed.) Résultats des Campagnes MUSORSTOM 14. Mémoires du Muséum national d'Histoire naturelle. Série A, Zoologie. 167: 459–498.

External links
 MNHN, Paris: holotype

Muricidae
Gastropods described in 1995